2010 FAM League is the 58th edition season of current third-tier league competition in Malaysia. The league is called TM Malaysia FAM League for sponsorship reason.

The league winner for 2010 season is Sime Darby FC.

Teams

The following teams participated in the 2010 TM Malaysia FAM League. In order by the number given by FAM:-

 1  Sinar Dimaja Mai Sarah FC
 2  KSK Tambun Tulang FC
 3  Sime Darby FC
 4  Juara Ban Hoe Leong FC
 5  UiTM Pahang FC
 6  KL SPA FC
 7  Melodi Jaya Sports Club
 8  MBJB FC

Season change

From Malaysia Premier League
( Relegated from 2009 Malaysia Premier League )
  Sinar Dimaja Mai Sarah FC
  MBJB FC

League table

References

2010
3